Venture Light Aircraft LLC is a US aircraft manufacturer based in Tucson, Arizona. It markets the Thorp T-211 in kitplane form.

Aircraft manufacturers of the United States
Companies based in Tucson, Arizona